Near East University is a university in Northern Cyprus. The university's women's basketball team is a Turkish Cypriot team that competes in the Turkish Women's Basketball League and represents Northern Cyprus. The club is based in Istanbul, Turkey.

In 2017, the NEU Angels achieved a continental treble by winning the Turkish League, Turkish Cup and the FIBA EuroCup in an all-Turkish final.

Honours

European competitions 
 FIBA EuroCup
 Winners (1): 2016–17
 FIBA Europe SuperCup
 Runners-up (1): 2017

National competitions 
 Turkish Women's Basketball League
 Winners (1): 2016–17
 Turkish Cup
 Winners (2): 2016–17, 2017–18
 Presidential Cup
 Winners (1): 2017

References

External links

Women's basketball teams in Turkey
Sport in Istanbul
Sport in Northern Cyprus
Near East University
2012 establishments in Turkey
2018 disestablishments in Turkey
Basketball teams established in 2012
Basketball teams disestablished in 2018